Scotochrosta is a genus of moths of the family Noctuidae.

Species
 Scotochrosta pulla (Denis & Schiffermüller, 1775)

References
Natural History Museum Lepidoptera genus database
Scotochrosta at funet

Cuculliinae